Boglárka Szabó is a Hungarian football midfielder currently playing in the Hungarian 1st Division for Astra Hungary FC. Currently an U-19 international, she made her debut with the senior Hungarian national team in the 2011 World Cup qualifying.

References

1993 births
Living people
Footballers from Budapest
Hungarian women's footballers
Women's association football midfielders
Astra Hungary FC players
Hungary women's international footballers